Rivaldo Costa Amaral Filho, or simply Rivaldo Costa (born May 8, 1978), is a retired Brazilian footballer who played as a forward.

Club career 

Rivaldo Costa is a typical 'journeyman', having played for several clubs in his career, most notably Deportivo de La Coruña of Spain, where he played for the "B" side in the Segunda División B.

Brazil 

As a youth player with Botafogo F.R., Rivaldo Costa was the 1995 Campeonato Carioca de Juniores (Rio de Janeiro Youth Championship) top goalscorer, and won the 1998 Campeonato Carioca de Juniores.

Rivaldo Costa joined Araçatuba (São Paulo) in 1999, where he had his first taste of first team football.

Europe 

In 2000, Rivaldo Costa was signed by Deportivo de La Coruña to play for their "B" team in the Segunda División B. His two-year stay was unsuccessful though, as Deportivo "B" finished last in the table, and were relegated to the Tercera División in 2001.

He played for Portuguese Segunda Divisão side Rio Ave and Italian Serie C2/B side F.C. Forlì, before moving to Saudi Arabia to play for Al Taawon in late 2002.

Asia 

Most of Rivaldo Costa's successes in football come from his time in Asia, most notably in Indonesia, where he played for Petrokimia Putra Gresik and Arema Malang in 2003 and 2004 respectively.

On July 20, 2003, while playing for Petrokimia Putra Gresik in the ASEAN Club Championship Quarter-Final, Rivaldo scored a goal against SAFFC as his club overcame a 2–0 deficit to win the game 3–2 and qualify for the Semi-Finals of the competition.

However, Gresik were knocked out by eventual winners East Bengal FC in the Semi-Final, but in the Third Place Match on July 26, Rivaldo Costa scored first to help his team to a 3–0 win over Perak FA.

Despite success in regional competition, Gresik were relegated from the Indonesian Premier Division (Division Utama) at the end of the 2003 season, and Rivaldo Costa joined Arema Malang.

A year later, Rivaldo Costa picked up his first major medal, scoring 12 goals as he helped Arema Malang to the Indonesian Division 1 (Divisi Satu) title, but it was a short-lived stay at the club, as he returned to Brazil to play for Bonsucesso in Rio de Janeiro.

He returned to play in Asia four years later, when he was signed by S-League club Geylang United.

On May 20, 2008, Rivaldo Costa scored his first goal for Geylang a decisive equaliser in the 94th minute to grab one point in a nail-biting 2–2 draw against Balestier Khalsa.

He scored his first hat-trick for the Eagles in a 5–1 romp over Dalian Shide Siwu FC on 6 November 2008.

Rivaldo Costa and his compatriot Luiz Carlos Machado Júnior have been released from Geylang United following an unsuccessful 2008 season where they finished 6th in the league.

Honours

Club 
Juniores do Botafogo F.R.
Campeonato Carioca de Juniores: 1998

Petrokimia Putra Gresik
ASEAN Club Championship: 2003 (3rd place

Arema Malang
Indonesian Division 1 (Divisi Satu): 2004

Individual 
Campeonato Carioca de Juniores top goalscorer: 1995

Personal life 
Rivaldo Costa speaks five languages fluently – his native Portuguese, English, Italian, Spanish, as well as Indonesian.

References 

1978 births
Living people
People from Vila Velha
Brazilian footballers
Association football forwards
Associação Esportiva Araçatuba players
Deportivo Fabril players
Rio Ave F.C. players
Forlì F.C. players
Al-Taawoun FC players
Petrokimia Putra players
Arema F.C. players
Bonsucesso Futebol Clube players
Desportiva Ferroviária players
Deportivo Marquense players
Geylang International FC players
Balestier Khalsa FC players
Segunda División B players
Liga Portugal 2 players
Serie C players
Saudi First Division League players
Liga 1 (Indonesia) players
Liga Nacional de Fútbol de Guatemala players
Singapore Premier League players
Brazilian expatriate footballers
Brazilian expatriate sportspeople in Spain
Brazilian expatriate sportspeople in Portugal
Brazilian expatriate sportspeople in Italy
Brazilian expatriate sportspeople in Saudi Arabia
Brazilian expatriate sportspeople in Indonesia
Brazilian expatriate sportspeople in Guatemala
Brazilian expatriate sportspeople in Singapore
Expatriate footballers in Spain
Expatriate footballers in Portugal
Expatriate footballers in Italy
Expatriate footballers in Saudi Arabia
Expatriate footballers in Indonesia
Expatriate footballers in Guatemala
Expatriate footballers in Singapore
Sportspeople from Espírito Santo